Kamionek  (German Klein Stein) is a village in the administrative district of Gmina Gogolin, within Krapkowice County, Opole Voivodeship, in south-western Poland.

During World War II was here "OT - Lager Klein Stein" concentration camp.

The village has a population of 664.

References

Kamionek